Mockbeggar is a geographic name. Places with this name include:

 Mockbeggar, Swale, in Kent, England.
 Mockbeggar, Hampshire, a village in England
 Mockbeggar, a hamlet near Higham, Kent, England
 Mockbeggar Wharf in Moreton, Merseyside, England

See also